Edi Bazar is an oldest market place of Old City, Hyderabad, India.

There are many 400-year-old mosques like old construction Charminar built during Nizam's era.

Commercial area
There are many shops in the market. Near Edi Bazar there is a large vegetable market at Madannapet. Railway station, bus facility is good and the international airport is just 20 km far away from Edi Bazar.

A mosque named Quba Mosque is situated in this locality.

Transport
Some of the nearby localities are Kumar Wadi Colony, Rein Bazar, Moin Bagh, Akber Bagh, Ali Nager, Fatehshah Nager, Mohammed Nagar. There are a lot of Masjids and prayer spots in this locality.

TSRTC connects Edi Bazar with all parts of the city from Edi Bazar to Charminar and Phisalbanda.

The closest MMTS Train station is at Yaqutpura.

Schools
Schools in the area include St.Mathews High School, Peace High School, Unique High School, Royal Public School, Government High School, Moral School, and Alberta School .

Many other educational institutions are there which offer tuitions and coachings to the students.

Religious Places
masajids in this area are Masjid e Hazrat Shujauddin, Masjid-e-abubakar, masjid e ghousia, masjid-e-ameer hamza, masjid farooq-e-azam, masjid-e-kunain etc, masjid e salheen, masjid e hajera ahle hadees.

Dargahs

Dargah of Hazrath Mir Shahjuddin Sahab is located here.

References

Neighbourhoods in Hyderabad, India